Jeff McNeil (born April 8, 1992), nicknamed "Squirrel" or "Flying Squirrel", is an American professional baseball utility player for the New York Mets of Major League Baseball (MLB). In 2022, he won the MLB Batting Title and the Silver Slugger Award.

Early life
McNeil attended Nipomo High School in Nipomo, California. He played baseball, basketball and golf. McNeil played three seasons of high school basketball and averaged 17 points per game as a senior. McNeil focused primarily on his golf career until his disappointing performance in the 2009 U.S. Junior Amateur Golf Championship after which his focus shifted to baseball. Because the high school golf and baseball seasons are both in spring, he did not play high school baseball until his senior year, but was offered a scholarship to play college baseball at Cal State Northridge due to his performance in summer ball. He hit .446 as a senior and committed to play at Cal State Northridge.

After Northridge's coach left the school, McNeil changed his commitment to Long Beach State. In 2012, he played collegiate summer baseball with the Brewster Whitecaps of the Cape Cod Baseball League. As a junior in 2013, McNeil had a .348 batting average with 11 strikeouts in 221 at bats; he was named to the All-Big West first team.

Career

Minor leagues
The New York Mets selected McNeil in the 12th round of the 2013 Major League Baseball draft. After signing, McNeil made his professional debut that summer with the Kingsport Mets, hitting .329 in 47 games. He played 2014 with the Savannah Sand Gnats and St. Lucie Mets, hitting .292 with three home runs, 51 RBIs, and 17 stolen bases in 117 games, and 2015 with St. Lucie and Binghamton Mets, slashing .308/.369/.377 with one home run, 40 RBIs, and 16 stolen bases in 123 games. After the 2015 season, he played in the Arizona Fall League.

In 2016, McNeil began using an unorthodox knobless bat given to him by Mets minor league hitting coordinator Lamar Johnson; he thenceforth began using knobless bats exclusively. He played in only 51 games combined in 2016 and 2017 with Binghamton, St. Lucie and Las Vegas 51s due to numerous injuries. McNeil started 2018 with the Binghamton Rumble Ponies and was promoted to Las Vegas during the season.

New York Mets

McNeil was promoted to the Major Leagues on July 24, 2018. He recorded his first Major League hit that night at Citi Field against Phil Hughes of the San Diego Padres on the first pitch he saw. He hit his first Major League home run off Tanner Roark of the Washington Nationals on July 31. For the season with the Mets, he batted .329/.381/.471 in 225 at bats. He led all MLB hitters (140 or more plate appearances) in batting average against right-handers, at .345. McNeil received one vote in the 2018 National League Rookie of the Year Award polling, placing him in a three-way tie for sixth place with Harrison Bader and Yoshihisa Hirano.

McNeil developed a reputation early in his Major League career as a "throwback" player notable for his high contact rate and low strikeout rate.

After playing second base in all but four defensive games during the 2018 season, McNeil spent the majority of 2019 in left field given that the Mets traded for second baseman Robinson Canó during the offseason. On June 30, 2019, McNeil was named to the National League All-Star team, his first selection. At the time of his selection, he led the majors with a .348 batting average. On August 5, 2019, McNeil recorded his 200th career hit in his 599th career at bat, becoming the fastest player in Mets history to 200 career hits. In 2019 he batted .318/.384/.531 with 23 home runs and 75 RBIs. Of all Major League batters, he swung at the highest percentage of pitches (59.9%) and the highest percentage of pitches inside the strike zone (85%).

Heading into the 2020 season, MLB Network ranked McNeil the fifth-best third baseman in baseball. In spite of that, McNeil again spent the majority of his games in left field for the Mets. He batted .311/.383/.454 in the pandemic-shortened season. He became the first Mets player since David Wright in 2005–09 to have a batting average of .300 or more in three straight seasons.

Prior to the 2021 season, MLB Network ranked McNeil the second-best second baseman in MLB and the best in the National League. That season, he batted .251/.319/.360 with 7 home runs and 35 RBIs in 120 games.

For the 2022 season McNeil changed his uniform number to 1 so newly-acquired outfielder Starling Marte could wear number 6.

On June 10, 2022, McNeil was named to the 2022 MLB All-Star Game as a representative for the National League, the second selection of his career. Originally chosen as a reserve for the squad, he wound up as  the starting second baseman after Miami Marlins second baseman Jazz Chisholm Jr. decided not to play due to injury. He was the first Mets position player to start an All Star Game since David Wright in 2013. McNeil went 0-1 with a HBP and a groundout in the game.

McNeil finished the 2022 regular season with a .326 batting average, the highest batting average of all qualified major league batters, winning the National League batting title. He was the first Met to do so since José Reyes in 2011. He also became the first Met to lead MLB in batting average. He had the lowest called strike plus whiff rate in the majors, at 19.0%. McNeil described the season as a "bounce-back year" from a comparatively poor 2021. It was described in The Athletic as "a massive rebound."

On November 10, 2022, McNeil won his first career Silver Slugger Award for second basemen. He was the first Met to win the award since Yoenis Céspedes won it in 2016. He also became the first Met second baseman to win the award since Edgardo Alfonzo in 1999.

On January 27, 2023, McNeil agreed to a four-year, $50 million contract to remain with the Mets. The deal includes a fifth-year team option.

Personal life

McNeil married his wife Tatiana (née DaSilva) on February 3, 2018, in Nipomo, California. The couple adopted a dog during the 2019 season which became "a social media sensation." Their first child, a son, was born in July 2022.

References

External links

1992 births
Living people
Baseball players from California
Binghamton Mets players
Binghamton Rumble Ponies players
Brewster Whitecaps players
Brooklyn Cyclones players
Kingsport Mets players
Las Vegas 51s players
Long Beach State Dirtbags baseball players
Major League Baseball infielders
Major League Baseball outfielders
National League All-Stars
National League batting champions
New York Mets players
Salt River Rafters players
Savannah Sand Gnats players
Silver Slugger Award winners
Sportspeople from Santa Barbara, California
St. Lucie Mets players
Syracuse Mets players
2023 World Baseball Classic players